Henry Tooley (d. 1551) was a Suffolk, England merchant. Alive during the Tudor period, by the time of his death he was one of the richest businessmen in the town of Ipswich. He was closely associated with the fellow merchant and Member of Parliament for Ipswich, Robert Daundy. His trade network extended Biscayan ports, the Netherlands and Iceland as well as including much of East Anglia east of line drawn between Chelmsford and Thetford – and the highly populated and industry towns of south Suffolk in particular. He left two testaments to his lucrative career as a merchant" the Tooley Almshouses and the account books preserved in the Suffolk Record Office.

References

1551 deaths
16th-century English businesspeople